The Philippines–Spain relations describes the relations between the Philippines and Spain. The relations between the two nations span from the 16th century, the Philippines was the lone colony of the Spanish Empire in Asia for more than three centuries. Both nations are members of the Association of Academies of the Spanish Language and the United Nations.

History

Precedents 
Even before the formal colonization of the Philippines by Spain, on the islands there were already Muslims and Moors who had escaped from the recently overthrown Emirate of Granada. As Muslim Castilian speakers were recorded to have been in the area as they spread throughout the Muslim world even as far as Islamic Manila, one of them was a man named Pazeculan This Castilian speaking Moor was in the service of the Rajah of Manila and Admiral of the Brunei Sultanate, Rajah Matanda, when he encountered the Magellan expedition.

Spanish colonization of the Philippines

Spain and the Philippines share a common history in the fact that the Philippines was part of the Spanish Empire for three hundred years and was the sole Spanish colony in Asia. Portuguese-born Spanish explorer Ferdinand Magellan first encountered the Philippines and named the islands after King Philip II of Spain.

In 1565, Spanish explorer Miguel López de Legazpi arrived from present-day Mexico and established a European settlement in Cebu. Soon afterwards, the Captaincy General of the Philippines was governed from the Viceroyalty of New Spain, based in Mexico City. For the next 300 years, the Philippines was a Spanish province. Trade and communication between Spain and the Philippines was administered by the Manila galleon.

In 1896, the Philippine Revolution began for independence from Spain. The revolution lasted through 1898 when the Spanish–American War broke out. The Spanish–American War resulted in Spain losing its domain over the Philippines and the nation was transferred over to the United States, thus ending the Philippine Revolution. The Philippines would be governed by the United States until 1946.

Post Independence 
During the Spanish Civil War, Filipino volunteers fought for both sides in the war. In 1947, the Philippines and Spain established diplomatic relations. Since the establishment of diplomatic relations, relations between both nations have strengthened through cultural and historical similarities. In 1995, King Juan Carlos I of Spain paid his first official visit to the Philippines. There have been several high-level visits between leaders of both nations.

King Juan Carlos I and his wife, Queen Sofia, attended the 1998 centennial celebrations in Manila, commemorating 100 years of independence from Spain. The mediation of the Spanish King is said to have produced the pardon and liberation of two Philippine domestic workers sentenced to death in Kuwait and the United Arab Emirates.  Philippine President, Gloria Macapagal Arroyo, concluded her second state visit in Spain in July 2006, bringing back millions of dollars of Spanish investments, particularly in tourism and information technology.

Spanish Ambassador to the Philippines, Jorge Domecq, told the reporters that the "Philippines is the only country in Asia to receive more aid and development assistance from Spain than any other Asian country". He added that the Philippines remains a priority of the Spanish aid in development efforts and partnerships with the EU, even despite budget cuts on development funding brought on by austerity measures being implemented by the Government of Spain.

In July 2012, the Queen Sofia visited the Philippines for a fourth time. She inspected several development projects around the former Spanish colony that her country's government is funding via the AECID. She visited the National Library, National Museum and the University of Santo Tomas. She also met with Spanish nationals residing in the Philippines, and attend a reception at the Spanish Embassy. She also attended a state dinner in her honour at Malacañang Palace hosted by President Benigno Aquino III. 
Also during her visit in the former colony of her country, Queen Sofia expressed appreciation to Aquino for the country's effort to reintroduce the Spanish language in the Philippine public education system.

Filipinos are one of the largest Asian communities in Spain, with a number of individuals obtaining Spanish citizenship. Most Filipinos in Spain work in various jobs and companies such as domestic and healthcare services, some individuals also work in education and government institutions.

In 2017, both nations celebrated 70 year of diplomatic relations. However, in 2019, the Philippine president, Rodrigo Duterte, dictated that he wanted to change the name of the country "Philippines" to "erase the Spanish historical trail", something he failed to do. On September 5 of the same year, the Spanish frigate Méndez Núñez made the historic port-visit, making it the first Spanish Navy vessel in the Philippines, since the Battle of Manila Bay during the Spanish–American War in 1898.

Currently, diplomatic relations between Spain and the Philippines are considerably weaker unlike the priorities that Spain has with other ASEAN countries, such as Cambodia, Indonesia, Malaysia, Singapore, Thailand, and Vietnam.

Cultural cooperation
Both countries have tried to rescue their historical ties. Since 2002, the Philippine–Spanish Friendship Day is celebrated every June 30, promoted with the aim of strengthening the relationship between both nations that share history, values, and traditions.

In 2009, the Philippine academic and former president, Gloria Macapagal Arroyo, was awarded the Don Quixote International Prize, which recognized the Philippine educational initiative to introduce the Spanish language in the Philippines. In this sense, on February 23, 2010, during the V Spain-Philippines Tribune, an agreement was reached between the Ministries of Education of Spain and the Philippines, the Instituto Cervantes, and the AECID, by which all secondary school students in the Philippines have the option to study Spanish since 2012.

Bilateral agreements

Both nations have signed several bilateral agreements such as a Treaty on civil rights and consular powers (1948); Treaty on the validity of academic degrees and the exercise of professions (1949); Air transportation agreement (1951); Agreement on the suppression of visas for diplomatic and official passport holders (1962); Agreement on technical cooperation in tourism (1971); Agreement on social security (1988); Agreement on economic and industrial cooperation (1988); Agreement to avoid double taxation and prevent tax evasion of income taxes (1989); Agreement for the promotion and reciprocal protection of investments (1992); Extradition treaty (2004); Memorandum of Understanding on Technical Cooperation in Matters of tourism (2007); Memorandum of Understanding of Cooperation in the field of Renewable Energies and Biofuels (2007); Agreement on Cultural, Sports and Educational Cooperation (2007); Treaty on transfer of convicted persons (2007) and an Agreement on cooperation in the fight against transnational crime (2015).

Resident diplomatic missions
 Philippines has an embassy in Madrid and a consulate-general in Barcelona.
 Spain has an embassy in Manila.

Country comparison

See also 
 Spanish Filipino
 Spanish influence on Filipino culture

References

 
Spain
Bilateral relations of Spain
Relations of colonizer and former colony